A banquet is a large public meal or feast.

Banquet or The Banquet may also refer to:

Film and television
The Banquet (1991 film), a film made to benefit the Hong Kong flood relief charity
The Banquet (2006 film), a Chinese film by Feng Xiaogang
Le Banquet, a 2008 Canadian drama film
A Banquet, a 2021 British horror film
"The Banquet" (Parks and Recreation), a 2009 television episode

Music
Banquet (album), by Lucifer's Friend, 1974
"Banquet"/"Staying Fat", a 2004 double A-side single by Bloc Party
"Banquet" (song), a 2005 re-release
"Banquet", a 1972 song by Joni Mitchell from For the Roses
Banquet Records, a shop and record label in London, England

People with the surname
David Banquet (born 1974), French rugby union player
Frédéric Banquet (born 1976), French rugby league and union player

Other uses
Banquet 400, now the Hollywood Casino 400, a NASCAR race at Kansas Speedway
Banquet Foods, an American brand of frozen foods
Operation Banquet, a British World War II defensive plan
Operation Banquet (Padang), a 1944 British World War II naval operation in the Southeast Pacific
 "Banquet", a 2017 TV advertisement for Bud Light that introduced the catchphrase "Dilly Dilly"
 The Banquet, a 1958 painting by René Magritte

See also
Banket (disambiguation)
Banquete, Texas
Banquette, a footpath along the inside of a rampart or parapet